The greater Azores bullfinch (Pyrrhula crassa) was a large, extinct species of bullfinch in the family Fringillidae that was once endemic to the Azores. It is the first known extinct passerine to be described from the islands. It is the largest known member of its genus based on its skull size, and had a very robust beak reminiscent of that of a parrot. However, the remains are otherwise reminiscent of the extant but highly endangered Azores bullfinch (Pyrrhula murina).

The species was described from subfossil remains found inside a lava tube in a volcano on Graciosa Island, although it may have inhabited other islands as well. The species was likely wiped out due to human settlement in the archipelago in the 15th century by the Portuguese, which led to habitat destruction and the introduction of invasive plant species, both of which depleted the laurel forest that P. crassa likely relied on.

References 

Birds of the Azores
Pyrrhula
Late Quaternary prehistoric birds
Birds described in 2017
Holocene extinctions